General McLane High School serves students in grades nine through twelve in the General McLane School District. The school district consists of the towns of Edinboro and McKean and the areas including Washington Township, McKean Township and Franklin Township which surround the two towns.

The General McLane Lancers football and boys' basketball teams won their respective Pennsylvania Interscholastic Athletic Association (PIAA) Class AAA Championships during the 2006–2007 academic year, making GM the first Pennsylvania high school to win both titles in the same academic year. 
Also home of the GM Marching Band which won LMBA championships in 2001, 2002, 2004, 2006, 2007, and 2011-2013 and placed second in 2005, 2008, 2009, and 2010.

2009 marks the 50th year of General Mclane.

History 
General McLane High School completed construction in 1960 even though Colonel McLane was not promoted to Brigadier General until April 1961.

References

External links
General McLane High School Webpage
General McLane School District Webpage

Public high schools in Pennsylvania
Educational institutions established in 1959
Schools in Erie County, Pennsylvania
1959 establishments in Pennsylvania